In Tibetan cuisine, Gyatog are noodles, much like those of the Han variety, made with eggs, flour and bone soup.

See also
 List of Tibetan dishes

References

Tibetan noodle dishes